Subhash Zanak  was the MLA from Risod Constituency and Ex-Cabinet Minister of Women and Child Development in the Government of Maharashtra in India. He was leader from the Indian National Congress Party.

Political career
He was elected as member of Maharashtra Legislative Assembly from Risod, in Washim district in October 2009. He was elected from Medshi (Vidhan Sabha constituency) in 1985, 1990 and 1995. He started his career by the guidance of his father Ramrao Zanak, who was elected as MLA from Medshi in 1980.

He died on 28 October 2013 at Akola in a private hospital from cardiac arrest.

References

Marathi politicians
Maharashtra MLAs 1985–1990
Maharashtra MLAs 1990–1995
Maharashtra MLAs 1995–1999
2013 deaths
People from Washim district
Maharashtra MLAs 2009–2014
1955 births
Indian National Congress politicians from Maharashtra